The women's 100 metres event at the 1967 Summer Universiade was held at the National Olympic Stadium in Tokyo on 30 and 31 August 1967.

Medalists

Results

Heats

Final

Wind: -0.3 m/s

References

Athletics at the 1967 Summer Universiade
1967